Apollon 1960 Krya Vrysi F.C. is a Greek football club, based in Krya Vrysi, Makedonia.

The club was founded in 1960. They will play in Gamma Ethniki for the season 2015-16.

Honors

Domestic Titles and honors
 Third Division: 1
 1969-70
 Fourth Division: 2
 1992-93, 1997–98
 Eps Pella Champions: 7
 1973-74, 1974–75, 1981–82, 1985–86, 1988–89, 2004–05, 2014–15
 Eps Pella Cup Winners: 4
 1983-84, 1990–91, 1996–97, 2014-15

External links

Football clubs in Central Macedonia